Thomas Lee Ridge (February 14, 1915 – September 13, 1999) was a United States Marine Corps officer who was wounded in Okinawa during World War II in 1945. He received the Silver Star for heroic conduct in the Korean War during street fighting in Seoul, Korea and the Legion of Merit with Combat "V" for his role in the defense of Hagaru-ri and the evacuation from the Chosin Reservoir area. He served as an attache to Colombia and Ecuador. After retiring from the Marine Corps in the rank of colonel in 1964, he worked as a Department of Defense civilian for 14 years.

Early life

Ridge attended Elgin High School, Elgin, Illinois, graduating in 1934.  He attended the University of Illinois and graduated in 1938 with a degree in Business. He participated in the Reserve Officer Training Corps (ROTC) program while at Illinois and was a member of Pershing Rifles Company F-3 as well as Scabbard and Blade. He was heavily involved in marksmanship serving on the university and ROTC marksmanship teams, winning several trophies and eventually becoming the team captain. Ridge received his second lieutenant's commission in the US Army Reserve, however resigned it to accept a commission in the Marine Corps on June 28, 1938. He was ordered to the Marine Barracks, Philadelphia, Pennsylvania, where he completed a course of instruction in the Basic School.

Military career

World War II

In the Marine Corps he continued to be involved in rifle marksmanship while serving at Marine Barracks at Boston Navy Yard and later at the Naval Air Station in Jacksonville Florida, where he was assigned as the officer in charge of the Small Bore Rifle Team. in late 1941 Ridge briefly served in the Central Recruiting Division in Chicago where he organized and developed a Mobile Recruiting Unit. From 1942 to 1944 he served as an intelligence officer assigned to the Naval Attache at the American Embassy in Rio de Janeiro, Brazil. During this tour he assisted the Brazilian Marines with their marksmanship program and planning the establishment of a US Naval Base in Rio de Janeiro as well as other US military facilities in Brazil. Upon his return from Brazil in 1944, he served as an intelligence planner with the Fleet Marine Force-Pacific and participated in the planning of several operations including the invasion of Iwo Jima, Okinawa, and the Occupation of Kyusha. He was wounded  twice observing the battle of Okinawa while on temporary duty with the 10th Army.

Korean War

In 1950, Ridge was given command of the 3rd Battalion, 1st Marines, 1st Marine Division at Camp Lejeune, North Carolina.  His battalion would participate in the amphibious landing on Inchon, Korea in September 1950. Later they would advance on and participate in the recapture of Seoul, Korea.  Ridge was awarded the Silver Star for his conspicuous gallantry in action for his leadership during the urban combat to recapture Seoul.  He also earned another Purple Heart for wounds sustained during the battle.  His unit then moved north to defend Hagaru-ri which was just 2500 yards below the southern tip of the Chosin Reservoir. After defending against numerous heavy Chinese attacks his unit fought their way out of the perimeter and south marching to the sea. Later he would receive the Legion of Merit with "V" device for valor for his battalion's defense near the Chosin Reservoir.

Post War

Promoted to the rank of Colonel in 1954, Ridge became the senior Marine Corps member of the Joint Amphibious Board. From 1955 to 1956 he was the Marine Corps Liaison Officer for Joint Amphibious Matters to the Commander at Little Creek, Virginia. In 1956, Ridge was transferred to the Staff of the Commanding General at Norfolk where he served as the Assistant Chief of Staff G-2. A year later in 1957, he was assigned to the newly created billet of Deputy Chief of Staff for Doctrine and Development at Marine Corps Schools Quantico, Virginia.  In 1961, he reestablished the office of the Naval Attache at the American Embassy in Bogota, Colombia, while simultaneously serving as the Naval Attache and Naval Attache for Air in Ecuador. Ridge retired in 1964, after over 25 years of service in the Marine Corps.

Civilian career

After retirement Ridge served as a Department of Defense civilian employee for 14 years. Among his assignments was duty as the Assistant Director in the office of the Assistant Secretary for International Security Affairs. He received the Defense Meritorious Civilian Service Medal. Upon retirement from his civilian career he resided in Potomac, Maryland, later moving to California in 1995.

Personal life

Thomas Ridge met his future wife while serving as a Naval Attache in Brazil. The daughter of an official of the Brazilian Ministry of Finance, Helen Guarano de Barros would travel to the United States with Ridge upon the end of his tour in October 1944. On November 6, 1944 they were married in Miami, Florida. A week later, Ridge would report to San Diego for service overseas. Helen remained with his mother in Elgin, Illinois. She would later serve as a Navy Lieutenant Commander and gain her US citizenship in 1947.

They had two children: Karen Lee and Thomas Lee Jr.

Awards and honors

Silver Star Citation

The President of the United States of America takes pleasure in presenting the Silver Star to Lieutenant Colonel Thomas L. Ridge (MCSN: 0-5833), United States Marine Corps, for conspicuous gallantry and intrepidity as Commanding Officer of the Third Battalion, First Marines, FIRST Marine Division (Reinforced), in action against enemy aggressor forces in the streets of Seoul, Korea, on 25 September 1950. Observing that hostile forces were stubbornly resisting the forward movement of his battalion, Lieutenant Colonel Ridge fearlessly moved elements of his command post to the immediate vicinity of the front lines in order to keep abreast of the situation and, repeatedly braving heavy hostile sniper and machine gun fire, skillfully directed his battalion's operations. Accurately estimating the enemy's capabilities and foreseeing a counterattack in the early hours of the next day, he expertly placed the units of his command on their night main line of resistance and, when the attack materialized, was primarily responsible for the success of the battalion in decisively defeating and throwing back the enemy with great loss in manpower and materiel. Although suffering from the pain of severe wounds to his hands, which had been inflicted when hostile phosphorus artillery shells landed in the command post, he courageously remained at his post throughout the night. His indomitable fighting spirit, tactical skill and heroic leadership during this aggressive action reflect great credit upon Lieutenant Colonel Ridge and the United States Naval Service.

Legion of Merit Citation

The President of the United States of America takes pleasure in presenting the Legion of Merit with Combat "V" to Lieutenant Colonel Thomas L. Ridge (MCSN: 0-5833), United States Marine Corps, for exceptionally meritorious conduct in the performance of outstanding services to the Government of the United States while serving as Commanding Officer of a Marine infantry battalion in Korea from 26 November to 10 December 1950. During the Chosin Reservoir operations against the enemy, Lieutenant Colonel Ridge discharged his responsibilities with great skill, aggressiveness and initiative. His battalion was charged with a portion of the defense at Hagaru-ri from 27 November 1950 to 7 December 1950, and from 28 November 1950 to 5 December 1950 he acted as Defense Area Commander. With complete disregard for his own personal safety and fatigue, he so skillfully employed his reinforced battalion that determined and coordinated enemy attacks against the defense were repelled, and the defense perimeter remained intact, withstanding all enemy efforts to overrun and destroy the garrison. A most capable and inspiring leader, he was directly instrumental in making it possible for other advancing units of the division to reorganize and replenish their supplies before continuing the advance, and the constructing of a base for the treatment and evacuation of casualties. In the attack to Koto-ri and Chinhung-ni, he continued the skillful tactical employment of the battalion, inflicting heavy casualties upon the enemy, inspiring the members of his command to even greater efforts, and contributing materially to the success achieved by the division. Lieutenant Colonel Ridge's skilled service and exemplary conduct throughout this period were in keeping with the highest traditions of the united States Naval Service. (Lieutenant Colonel Ridge is authorized to wear the Combat "V".)

Bronze Star Citation
For meritorious service in connection with operations against the enemy while serving as commanding officer of a Marine infantry battalion in KOREA from 28 October 1950 to 14 November 1950. Assigned the independent mission of establishing a defensive position at Majon-ni to deny the enemy the use of this important road hub, Lieutenant Colonel RIDGE expertly retained tactical control of his battalion despite opposition by numerically superior enemy forces, by the skillful employment of combat patrols, reconnaissance in force, and the use of supporting arms. In addition, by emphasising the employment of his intelligence agencies, and as a result of a sound civil affairs program which won the support of the native population, he was able to obtain an unusual volume of intelligence information, which permitted the establishment of the defensive position deep in enemy territory. When enemy forces cut the main supply route to his rear, completely surrounding his position, he skillfully coordinated the air dropping of essential supplies, and on two occasions elements of his battalion fought their way through enemy roadblocks with supplies. During the course of the action, a total of 1395 prisoners of war were taken, and heavy casualties were inflicted on the enemy. His sound and inspiring leadership and thorough knowledge of the problems involved resulted in the successful completion of his mission. Lieutenant Colonel RIDGE's exemplary and meritorious conduct throughout was in keeping with the highest traditions of the United States Naval Service.

Lieutenant Colonel RIDGE is authorized to wear the combat "V"

Air Medal Citation
For meritorious acts while participating in aerial flight over enemy territory. Serving with a Marine division in action against the enemy in KOREA, during the period 28 September 1950 to 16 July 1951, Lieutenant Colonel RIDGE participated in a total of twenty-two liaison and reconnaissance flights in slow unarmed aircraft at extremely low altitudes over areas where enemy anti-aircraft fire was received or could be expected. Information gained during these flights aided materially in the success of ground operations. Lieutenant Colonel RIDGE's actions throughout were in keeping with the highest traditions of the United States Naval Service.

References

1915 births
1999 deaths
Military personnel from Chicago
Pershing Riflemen
United States Marine Corps colonels
Recipients of the Silver Star